Robert Schooley is an American screenwriter, television writer and television producer. He and Mark McCorkle are the creators of the 2002 animated television series Kim Possible, which aired on Disney Channel. He was also an executive producer of the series, as well as having written scripts for several episodes. He has worked on several DreamWorks Animation shows, including The Penguins of Madagascar, Monsters vs. Aliens, and All Hail King Julien. He also wrote a book called "Liar of Kudzu" with McCorkle. He comes from Levittown, Pennsylvania. From 2017 to 2021, he and McCorkle produced Big Hero 6: The Series, which aired on Disney XD and Disney Channel.

He has written screenplays for films like Aladdin: The Return of Jafar, Aladdin and the King of Thieves, The Lion King II: Simba's Pride, Buzz Lightyear of Star Command: The Adventure Begins, Sky High and Hotel for Dogs.

Filmography
Maxie's World - sound department (1987)
The Real Ghostbusters - producer, sound department (1988-1990)
ALF Tales - sound department (1988)
A.L.F. - sound department (1988-1989)
C.O.P.S. - producer, sound department (1988-1989)
The New Adventures of Beany and Cecil - sound department (1988)
G.I. Joe: Operation Dragonfire (1989)
Ring Raiders - casting director (1989)
Captain N: The Game Master - sound department (1989)
Teenage Mutant Ninja Turtles - producer (1989)
The Karate Kid (TV series) - sound department (1989)
Camp Candy - sound department (1989)
New Kids on the Block - producer, (1989)
The Super Mario Bros. Super Show! - sound department (1989)
Little Golden Book Land - sound department (1989)
Captain Planet and the Planeteers - producer, sound department (1990-1991)
Swamp Thing (1991)
Goof Troop - producer (1992)
Bonkers (1993)
The Return of Jafar - screenwriter (1994)
Aladdin: The Series - story editor (1994)
Aladdin and the King of Thieves - screenwriter (1996)
Great Minds Think 4 Themselves - writer (1997)
The Lion King 2: Simba's Pride - screenwriter (1998)
Disney's Hercules - writer, producer (1998-1999)
Buzz Lightyear of Star Command: The Adventure Begins - screenwriter, producer (2000)
Buzz Lightyear of Star Command - writer, producer (2000-2001)
Kim Possible - co-creator, executive producer, writer, lyrics (1 episode) (2002-2007)
Kim Possible: A Sitch in Time - executive producer (2003)
Kim Possible Movie: So the Drama - screenwriter, executive producer, story editor (2005)
Sky High - screenwriter (2005)
Enchanted - uncredited rewrite (2007)
Hotel for Dogs - screenwriter (2009)
The Penguins of Madagascar - writer, executive producer (2009-2015)
Monsters vs. Aliens - writer, executive producer (2013-2014)
Tinker Bell and the Legend of the NeverBeast - screenwriter (2014)
All Hail King Julien - executive consultant: season 1 (2014)
Big Hero 6: The Series - co-developer, executive producer (2017–2021)
Kim Possible - screenwriter, executive producer, based on TV series (2019)

External links 

https://twitter.com/bob_schooley

References 

American male screenwriters
American television producers
American television writers
Nickelodeon Animation Studio people
Disney Television Animation people
DreamWorks Animation people
Living people
Place of birth missing (living people)
Year of birth missing (living people)
American male television writers
Primetime Emmy Award winners